Dysschema brunnea is a moth of the family Erebidae. It was described by Herbert Druce in 1911. It is found in Ecuador.

References

Dysschema
Moths described in 1911